Q75 may refer to:
 Q75 (New York City bus)
 Al-Qiyama, a surah of the Quran
 
 Hyampom Airport, in Trinity County, California, United States